The Regent Street Cinema is an independent British Cinema located on Regent Street, London. Opened in 1848 and regarded as "the birthplace of British cinema", the cinema featured the first motion picture shown in the United Kingdom. Today, the cinema screens both independent and studio films in the heart of Central London.

Description
Originally opened in 1848, the Regent Street Cinema is an independent cinema located at 307 Regent Street, London and situated next to the University of Westminster. The cinema contains 187 seats, bar and spacious foyer. The cinema is known for having shown the first screening of moving footage in the United Kingdom. It was also the first in the United Kingdom to show an X-rated film. The cinema is able to screen 16 mm, 35 mm and 4K digital formats. The cinema has been described as "the birthplace of British cinema".

History
The Regent Street Cinema was first opened in 1848 and is housed in the flagship building of the Royal Polytechnic Institution (now University of Westminster). When it was first opened, it was used as a theatre. In late February in 1896, the cinema played a short movie by the Lumière Brothers. It was the first motion picture shown in the United Kingdom. In 1951, La Vie Commence Demain (Life Begins Tomorrow), an X-rated film because of its war imagery, was shown. The cinema was the first in the United Kingdom to show an X-rated film.

Reopening: 1980–2015
Although the cinema continued to screen films for another eighty-four years after the original Lumière Brothers footage, the cinema was closed for thirty-five years, from 1980 to 2015. Throughout most of this time, the cinema was used as a lecture theatre. In 2012, the University of Westminster began a project to restore the building. The restoration project took three years to complete and cost £6.1 million. By February 2014, £4 million was raised through an appeal, but another £2 million was needed. Out of the £6.1 million, £1.5 million was awarded through a Heritage Lottery Fund grant and £2m was donated by the Quintin Hogg Trust. Celebrities including broadcaster Sandi Toksvig and filmmaker Asif Kapadia backed the appeal. It was hoped the cinema would reopen in 2014.

The Art Deco features of the building's 1920 design were restored, along with the 1936 John Compton organ and the dome-like ceiling. Upon reopening in 2016, a documentary of the managers of the English rock band The Who, titled Lambert and Stamp, was screened. Shira MacLeod, the director of the Regent Street Cinema, said it is the only cinema in the United Kingdom that can screen films in 16 mm, 35 mm, Super 8 and 4K, allowing the cinema to show films that "have been in archives for many years".

The cinema is a Grade-II listed building.

References
Notes

Citations 

Sources

External links
 
 Official website of the University of Westminster

Repertory cinemas
1848 establishments in England
Cinemas in London
Grade II listed buildings in the City of Westminster